Dynamic Amplification Factor (DAF) or Dynamic Increase Factor (DIF), is a dimensionless number which describes how many times the deflections or stresses should be multiplied to the deflections or stresses caused by the static loads when a dynamic load is applied on to a structure.

When lifting an object during a sub-sea operation, the DAF is calculated based on dynamic hydraulic forces or on snap-forces. 

Where:
 is the mass of the object in air (kg) 
 is the acceleration of gravity (9.81m/s2)

References

Dimensionless numbers